The 2017–18 Western Michigan Broncos men's basketball team represents Western Michigan University during the 2017–18 NCAA Division I men's basketball season. The Broncos, led by 15th-year head coach Steve Hawkins, play their home games at University Arena as members of the West Division of the Mid-American Conference. They finished the season 17–15, 9–9 in MAC play to finish fourth in the West Division. As the No. 8 seed in the MAC tournament, they lost in the first round of the conference tournament to Akron.

Previous season
The Broncos finished the 2016–17 season 16–16, 11–7 in MAC play to tie for first in the West Division. As the No. 5 seed in the MAC tournament, they lost in the quarterfinals of the conference tournament to Ball State. They declined invitations from both the CollegeInsider.com and College Basketball Invitational postseason tournaments.

Offseason

Recruiting class of 2017

Roster

Schedule and results

|-
!colspan=9 style=|Exhibition

|-
!colspan=9 style=|Non-conference regular season

|-
! colspan=9 style=| MAC regular season

|-
!colspan=9 style=| MAC tournament

See also
 2017–18 Western Michigan Broncos women's basketball team

References

Western Michigan
Western Michigan Broncos men's basketball seasons